Miguel Ángel Reyes-Varela and Blaž Rola were the defending champions but chose not to defend their title.

Guido Andreozzi and Guillermo Durán won the title after defeating Ariel Behar and Gonzalo Escobar 2–6, 7–6(7–5), [10–5] in the final.

Seeds

Draw

References
 Main Draw

Lima Challenger - Doubles
2018 Doubles